The Secret of Hidden Lake (also titled Deadly Season outside the United States) is a 2006 American made-for-television thriller film starring Rena Sofer and Winston Rekert. The film first aired on October 29, 2006 on Lifetime Network.

Plot 
A young woman named Maggie Dolan (Rena Sofer) who works at a legal aid center in Chicago, suddenly hears that her father, Frank Dolan (Winston Rekert) got injured while hunting.  Maggie then returns to her hometown in Colorado to be at her father's side.  During her stay, she learns that her father's injury was not an accident.  As Maggie tries to unravel the mystery of what really happened, hidden secrets start to surface, putting her life in jeopardy.

Cast 
Rena Sofer as Maggie Dolan
Winston Rekert as Frank Dolan
Linda Darlow as Alice Crandell
Adam Harrington as Sam
William B. Davis as Judge Landers
Bill Mondy as Zach Roth
Renae Morriseau as Sheriff Tillane
Kett Turton as Jack Ford Jr.
Dean Wray as Jack Ford Sr.
Jodelle Ferland as Young Maggie Dolan
Elfina Luk as Barb
Timothy Paul Perez as Dr. Perez
Christine Barrie as Maggie's mother

References

2006 television films
2006 films
2006 thriller films
Lifetime (TV network) films
American thriller television films
Films set in Colorado
2000s English-language films
2000s American films